This is a partial list of New York Improv comedians and singers. In the 1960s, 1970s and 1980s they performed regularly at the Improvisation Comedy Club. The Improv was founded by Budd Friedman and his then wife Silver Saundors Friedman in 1963, and was located at 358 West 44th Street, New York City, in an area known as Hell's Kitchen.

Shelley Ackerman
Bobby Alto
Richard Belzer
Elayne Boosler
David Brenner
Jimmy Brogan
Ron Carey
Billy Crystal
Rodney Dangerfield
Larry David
John DeBellis
Al Franken
Gilbert Gottfried
Allan Havey
Gabe Kaplan
Andy Kaufman
Michael Patrick King
Robert Klein
Steve Landesberg
Jay Leno
Richard Lewis
Lynne Lipton
Bruce Mahler
Ken Ober
Rick Overton
Joe Piscopo
Freddie Prinze
Richard Pryor
Rita Rudner
Lenny Schultz
Ronnie Shakes
Tim Thomerson
Liz Torres
Jimmie Walker
Robert Wuhl
Alan Zweibel

External links
History of the Improv
Article about Improv founder Budd Friedman
Interview with Chris Albrecht (pdf)
One comedian's journey
The recollections of an Improv pianist

New York improv
Improvisational theatre